The following is a list of presidents of the University of Rhode Island.

References 

University of Rhode Island
Rhode Island
Presidents of the University of Rhode Island